Cieza is a municipality located in the autonomous community of Cantabria, Spain. According to the 2007 census, the city has a population of 664 inhabitants. Its capital is Villayuso de Cieza.

Twin towns
 Cieza, Spain

References

External links
Cieza - Cantabria 102 Municipios

Municipalities in Cantabria